The 2016–17 season was West Bromwich Albion's seventh consecutive season in the Premier League and their 139th year in existence. This season West Bromwich Albion participated in the Premier League, FA Cup and League Cup.

The season covers the period from 1 July 2016 to 30 June 2017, with competitive matches played between August and May.

Background

Prior to the start of the season, Sam Wallace of The Telegraph predicted that the team would finish in 16th and referred to the club's lack of pre-season transfer activity. Phil McNulty, the BBC's chief football writer, expected head coach Tony Pulis to deliver stability and predicted a 14th-place finish for Albion. The Guardian'''s prediction also had the club finishing in 14th.

Ahead of the start of the season, Albion decorated their home ground, The Hawthorns, with images of contemporary and former players.

Players
First-team squadSquad at end of season''

Left club during season

Reserves and academy

Statistics

Appearances and goals

|-
! colspan=14 style=background:#dcdcdc; text-align:center| Goalkeepers

|-
! colspan=14 style=background:#dcdcdc; text-align:center| Defenders

|-
! colspan=14 style=background:#dcdcdc; text-align:center| Midfielders

|-
! colspan=14 style=background:#dcdcdc; text-align:center| Forwards

|-
! colspan=14 style=background:#dcdcdc; text-align:center| Players transferred out during the season

Transfers

Transfers in

Transfers out

Loans in

Loans out

Competitions

Overview

{| class="wikitable" style="text-align: center"
|-
!rowspan=2|Competition
!colspan=8|Record
|-
!
!
!
!
!
!
!
!
|-
| Premier League

|-
| FA Cup

|-
| League Cup

|-
! Total

Pre-season friendlies
On 11 May 2016, West Bromwich Albion announced a friendly double-header in Devon with games coming against Plymouth Argyle and Torquay United. A day later, on 12 May, the club announced a third pre-season friendly against Kidderminster Harriers, it will take place on 16 July. On 22 June, West Brom announced that they have accepted an invitation to take part in the inaugural 2016 Fox Sports Cup.

Premier League

League table

Results summary

Results by matchday

Matches

FA Cup

EFL Cup

Notes

References

West Bromwich Albion
West Bromwich Albion F.C. seasons